The Green and the Grey is the seventh studio album by British singer-songwriter Darren Hayman. It was released on Hayman's own Belka label in 2011 as a companion piece to his Essex Arms album. It is his fourth album with his backing band the Secondary Modern.

Track listing
 "The Green and the Grey" – 4:53
 "Essex Arms" – 2:19
 "Nothing You Can Do About It (Alternate Version)" – 3:57
 "No Undo" – 2:36
 "Cocoa Butter (Demo Version)" – 4:22
 "Until We Got Bored" – 3:30
 "Beach Head" – 2:52
 "Sleep Through the Afternoon" – 2:57
 "Horror Video Nights" – 5:01
 "She Can Cook" – 3:03
 "The Winter Makes You Want Me More (Alternate Version)" – 5:00
 "Spiderman Beats Ironman (Alternate Version)" – 3:19
 "0s and 1s" – 5:23
 "Sting and His Lute" – 4:24
 "Trees and Leaves" – 4:51
 "Young Love" – 3:24

2011 albums
Darren Hayman albums